Pittaluga is an Italian surname. Variants of Pittaluga include Pitaluga and Piccaluga. The original spelling of the name is Pitaluga, as Pita l'uga in the Genoese dialect literally translates to "pick the grape", "Enjoys the taste of grapes". Could also be a reference to Frankish Gauls & Lombard Italy. After the unification of Italy, however, like many other names the Florentine dialect (the official national Italian language) adapted the spelling to become Pittaluga.

Notable people with the surname include:
Francesco Pittaluga (born 1911), Italian rower
Gustavo Pittaluga (doctor) (1876–1956), Italian doctor and biologist
Gustavo Pittaluga (composer) (1906–1975), Spanish composer
Stefano Pittaluga (1887–1932), Italian film producer

See also 
Michele Pittaluga International Classical Guitar Competition

References